Harriman station is a commuter rail stop on the Metro-North Railroad's Port Jervis Line, serving the village of Harriman, the town and village of Monroe, and the town of Woodbury in Orange County, New York. Before its use as a station, the area was better known as "Newburgh Junction" and was where the Erie Railroad's mainline separated from the Newburgh Shortcut (and, later on and more importantly, the Graham Line). This junction was controlled by "NJ" interlocking tower and, while the mainline has been abandoned since 1983, the wye remains intact.

Station layout
 
The station has two tracks and a low-level side platform with a pathway connecting the platform to the siding, however the siding does not connect to the bypassing track where there is a switch near the Newburgh Junction, which is located a few feet north of the station. The station has a very large parking lot (986 spaces) due to its proximity to the New York State Thruway, Route 17, and the Woodbury Commons outlet mall. There is a weekend-only shuttle bus between the station and the mall.

External links 

Metro-North Railroad stations in New York (state)
Railway stations in Orange County, New York
NJ Transit Rail Operations stations